The Hogatza River is a  tributary of the Koyukuk River in the U.S. state of Alaska. Beginning in the Gates of the Arctic National Park and Preserve, it flows generally southwest to meet the larger river west of Hughes. The river's name is from the Koyukon language, but the meaning is uncertain.

See also
List of rivers of Alaska

References

Rivers of Northwest Arctic Borough, Alaska
Rivers of Alaska
Rivers of Yukon–Koyukuk Census Area, Alaska
Tributaries of the Yukon River
Rivers of Unorganized Borough, Alaska